Don Ihde (born 1934) is an American philosopher of science and technology. In 1979 he wrote what is often identified as the first North American work on philosophy of technology, Technics and Praxis.

Before his retirement, Ihde was Distinguished Professor of Philosophy at the State University of New York at Stony Brook. In 2013 Ihde received the Golden Eurydice Award.

Ihde is the author of over twenty original books and the editor of many others. Ihde lectures and gives seminars internationally and some of his books and articles have appeared in a dozen languages.

Major concepts and thought

Postphenomenology 
Don Ihde uses the theoretical tools of phenomenology to analyse technology, and specifically the relations between humans and technological artefacts. Rather than thinking about technology as an abstract category, postphenomenological analysis looks at actual artefacts and the way they interact with users. Technologies, according to this view, mediate our relationship to the world, influencing the way we see it, understand it, act on it. Other important authors in the field of postphenomenology are Peter-Paul Verbeek and Robert Rosenberger.

Bodies in cyberspace
Ihde's work Bodies in Technology spells out the original exploration of the ways cyberspace affects the human experience. The book explores embodiment in cyberspace with references to human–computer interaction (HCI) research. The main question of the book is the meaning of bodies in technology.

Ihde rejects Cartesian dualism. Even to have an out of body experience is to have an implicit 'here-body' from which we experience an 'object-body' over there. He has further explored these arguments in his book Bodies in Technology.

Beginning with a "phenomenology of multistability" in the way various "technological media" are perceived, Ihde examines the "roles of human embodiment, perception, and spatial transformations within communication and information media."

Ihde argues that movies like the Matrix trilogy play upon fantasy in a technological context and relate to the human sense of embodiment. He stresses an important fact that we have to experience the embodiment where we live, rather than to "plugin" to a technofantasies world.

Technoscience
The study of technoscience examines cutting-edge work in the fields of the philosophies of science and technology, and science studies; it also emphasizes the roles of our material cultures and expertise. According to Ihde, science and technology are in a symbiotic relationship, where scientific research relies fully on the development of scientific instruments, the technological development.

In a paper "Was Heidegger prescient concerning Technoscience?", Ihde re-examines Martin Heidegger's philosophy of science with a reappraisal of what was innovative, and what remained archaic. Heidegger then is read against the background of the "new" approaches to science in science studies, and against the background of the scientific revolutions which have occurred since the mid-20th century.

Material and expanding hermeneutics 
Ihde has introduced the concept of  material hermeneutics, which characterises much practice within the domains of technoscience. He rejects the vestigial Diltheyan division between the humanistic and natural sciences and argues that certain types of critical interpretation, broadly hermeneutic, characterize both sets of disciplines. He examines what he calls a style of interpretation based in material practices relating to imaging technologies which have given rise to the visual hermeneutics in technoscience studies.

With references to science studies, sociology of science and feminist critique of science, Ihde has presented the idea of expanding hermeneutics, which emphasises praxis, instruments and laboratories over theoretical work. He claims that in science, the instruments and technologies used operate in a hermeneutic way.

Philosophers in "R&D"
Ihde has argued on numerous occasions that "if the philosopher is to play a more important role it must not be only in or limited to the Hemingway role. Rather, it should take place in the equivalent of the officers' strategy meeting, before the battle takes shape. I will call this the 'R&D role'". Philosophers should engage themselves on interdisciplinary research teams and actively participate in research and development work. He has claimed that only by having philosophers in the R&D labs they can have truly new and emerging technologies that are philosophically engaged. Philosophers, precisely postphenomenologists, could help the scientific community to think about the future, rather than only about present-day phenomena or the past.

Selected works

Books
Sense and Significance (1973)
Listening and Voice: A phenomenology of sound (1976)
Experimental Phenomenology: An Introduction (1977)
Technics and Praxis: A Philosophy of Technology (1979)
Hermeneutic Phenomenology: The Philosopher of Paul Ricoeur (1980)
Existential Technics (1983)
Consequences of Phenomenology (1986)
Technology and the Lifeworld: From Garden to Earth (1990)
Instrumental Realism (1991)
Postphenomenology: essays in the postmodern context (1993)
Philosophy of Technology: An Introduction (1998)
Expanding Hermeneutics: Visualism in Science (1999)
Bodies in Technology (2001)
Chasing Technoscience (2003)
Listening and Voice: Phenomenologies of Sound (2nd expanded edition, 2007)
Ironic Technics (2008)
Postphenomenology and Technoscience (Chinese 2008, English 2009; also in Spanish, Hebrew and forthcoming Portuguese)
Embodied Technics (2010)
Heidegger's Technologies: Postphenomenological Perspectives (2010)
Expanded 2nd edition, Experimental Phenomenology: Multistabilities (2012)
Acoustic Technics (2015)
Husserl's Missing Technologies (2016)
Medical Technics (2019)

Articles
 Ihde, D. (1997). Thingly hermeneutics/Technoconstructions in Man and World 30: 369–381, 1997, Kluwer Academic Publishers. Printed in the Netherlands.
 Ihde, D. (2000). Technoscience and the 'other' continental philosophy in Continental Philosophy Review 33: 59–74,  Kluwer Academic Publishers. Printed in the Netherlands.
 Ihde, D. (2003). THE ULTIMATE PHENOMENOLOGICAL REDUCTION (pp. 59 – 67) in Interfaces 21/22 http://topologicalmedialab.net/xinwei/classes/readings/Arakawa+Gins/Interfaces-Arakawa_volume21-22-1.pdf
 Ihde, D. (2004). A phenomenology of technics. In D. M. Kaplan (Ed.) Readings in the philosophy of technology (pp. 137–159). Lanham, MD.: Rowman & Littlefield.
 Ihde D. (2004a). Simulation and embodiment In: yearbook of the Institute of Advanced Study on Science, Technology and Society, Profil Verlag, pp 231–244.
 Ihde D. (2006). Technofantasies and embodiment. In: Diocaretz M, Herbrechter S (eds) The matrix in theory, (Rodopi, 2006), pp 153–166. 
 Ihde D. (2008). Of which human are we post? In: The global spiral (Publication of Metanexus Institute) vol 9, Issue 3, June 2008.

References

External links
 Don Ihde – The fantasy draws upon deep human desires, where Ihde is talking about history of technofantasies, postphenomenology of embodiment and transhumanism
Ihde's home page at Stony Brook University.
Interview with Don Ihde, May 2003.
Interview (audio) with Ihde, March 2006.
A festschrift on Ihde.
Ihde on Listening and Voice. Phenomenologies of Sound.
Larry Hickman on Postphenomenology and Pragmatism: Closer Than You Might Think?" published in Techné: Research in Philosophy and Technology, Vol. 12 No. 2, Spring 2008
Contributors discuss Don Ihde's corpus on postphenomenology published in Techné: Research in Philosophy and Technology, Vol. 12 No. 2, Spring 2008
Andrew Feenberg discusses Ihde's Bodies in Technology published in Techné: Research in Philosophy and Technology, vol. 7 no. 2, 2003
Peter-Paul Verbeek reviews Ihde's Expanding Hermeneutics: Visualism in Science published in Techné 6:3 Spring 2003
Don Ihde: Postphenomenology, Embodiment and Transhumanism, Society for Social Studies of Science, Buenos Aires, Argentina, August 23, 2014 (with Subtitles in Portuguese) 
Interview with Don Ihde @ Figure/Ground. September 4th, 2010

1934 births
20th-century American philosophers
21st-century American philosophers
American male non-fiction writers
American philosophy academics
American consciousness researchers and theorists
Continental philosophers
Descartes scholars
Heidegger scholars
Hermeneutists
Lecturers
Living people
Phenomenologists
Philosophers of culture
Philosophers of mind
Philosophers of science
Philosophers of social science
Philosophers of technology
Philosophy writers
Historians of technology
Historians of science
Stony Brook University faculty
20th-century American male writers
21st-century American male writers